Per-Åge Skrøder (born August 4, 1978) is a Norwegian former ice hockey player, who last played for Modo in the HockeyAllsvenskan (Allsv).

Playing career 
Previously, he played for the Norwegian teams Lillehammer and Sparta Warriors, and the Swedish teams Frölunda Indians, Linköping, HV 71 and Södertälje. In 2004 and 2007, he became Swedish champion. The first time with HV71 and the latter with Modo.
In June 2017 Skrøder officially announced his retirement.

Skrøder played in the Norwegian national ice hockey team since 1999. In 2009 he scored his biggest personal achievement during his career, winning the points scorer rankings in the Swedish league, after playing with Niklas Sundström as center. The two formed an incredible partnership in the latter years of the decade with Modo.

Awards and honours
 Norwegian Player of the Year in 2002.
 Elitserien Champion with HV71 in 2004.
 Elitserien Champion with Modo Hockey in 2007.

Career statistics

Regular season and playoffs

International

References

External links 

1978 births
Frölunda HC players
HV71 players
Ice hockey players at the 2010 Winter Olympics
Lillehammer IK players
Linköping HC players
Living people
Modo Hockey players
Norwegian expatriate ice hockey people
Norwegian ice hockey left wingers
Olympic ice hockey players of Norway
People from Sarpsborg
Södertälje SK players
Sparta Warriors players
Ice hockey players at the 2014 Winter Olympics
Sportspeople from Viken (county)
Norwegian expatriate sportspeople in Sweden
Expatriate ice hockey players in Sweden